The Subaru Baja is an all-wheel-drive, four passenger, four-door utility manufactured from 2002 to 2006 by Subaru and marketed for model years 2003 to 2006. The Baja combines the handling and passenger carrying characteristics of a traditional passenger car with the open-bed versatility, and to a lesser degree, load capacity of a pickup truck.

The unibody design borrowed heavily from the existing mechanicals, platform and sheet metal of the Subaru Legacy/Outback wagon. Production began on July 18, 2002 as a 2003 model at the Subaru of Indiana Automotive, Inc. factory in Lafayette, Indiana.

The name Baja derives from the Mexican peninsula of Baja California; home to the Baja 1000 off-road race.

Design and engineering 
See also: Subaru ST-X concept vehicle

Working with technical support from Subaru Japan, a team led by Peter Tenn, Subaru senior designer, penned the Baja in the United States. According to an August, 2002 interview with Tenn, "the Baja's jarring look is homage to rally-race trucks. It's supposed to look funky, look different. It doesn't fit any category, and we knew that going in. It's not like anything else on the road. And that's important to a lot of people."

The Baja followed closely Subaru's ST-X (Sport Truck X-perimental) concept vehicle presented at the 2000 Los Angeles International Auto Show and also designed by a special Subaru America design team. The ST-X offered a greater complement of features than the production Baja (power rear window, under floor storage compartment, tailgate cup holders), but nevertheless set the production groundwork for an Outback-based, four-door, car-truck hybrid.

In a package  longer than an Outback, the Baja featured a four-door passenger compartment along with a  open bed and drop-down tailgate. A light in the instrument cluster signaled an "open" status for the Switchback. The design featured two stainless steel exposed buttresses behind the passenger compartment, marketed as Sports Bars, providing structural reinforcement for the open bed.

Market and sales 
Subaru marketed the Baja in the United States, Canada and Chile. In the United States and Canada, Subaru marketed the Baja as a "multiple-choice vehicle." Limited advertising, late arrival of the turbo-charged model, heavily styled lower-body plastic cladding and a yellow-and-silver introductory color scheme discouraged broad appeal. James Healey, writing for USAtoday at the time of the Baja's introduction called it a "controversial fashion statement with limited utility".

The Baja received the 2003 and 2004 J.D. Powers's APEAL (for Automotive Performance, Execution and Layout Study) Award—measuring owner delight with the design, content, layout and performance of their new vehicles for "Most Appealing Compact Pickup" and the Consumer Reports 2006 highest score for reliability in the pickup truck category.

With Subaru projecting to sell 24,000 per year, 30,000 were marketed over four and a half years.

In 2007, Subaru of America reached agreement with Toyota Motor Corporation allowing Subaru Indiana to manufacture Camrys to meet Toyota's excess demand — and enabling Subaru to reassign the Baja production line and maximize plant utilization.

Subaru discontinued Baja production in April 2006. Subaru stock-piled an inventory of 2006 models before discontinuing production, allowing dealers to continue to sell 2006 models as late as February 2008. The Baja was removed from the Subaru USA website on July 31, 2007, following its removal from the Subaru Chile website in April 2007.

Model year changes 

 2003: the launch model featured leather seats, power driver's seat, and sunroof. A lower priced "Sport" model, equipped with cloth interior and manually-adjustable seats followed later in the production year, also without color-keyed exterior door handles and mirrors, four-beam headlamps, leather shift and steering wheel, front door puddle lights or an illuminated ignition key ring.
 2004: introduced a new 2.5-liter turbocharged model producing . This model featured standard manual or optional automatic transmission with Sportshift, a large hood scoop and color-matched exterior door handles and side mirrors.
 2005: all models were given a further increase in ride height, a power outlet in the center console, rear seat back net pocket, and turbocharged models with leather offered a new tonneau bed cover.
 2006: the turbocharged variant received an optional package that included leather trimmed upholstery, heated seats, special alloy wheels, a hard bed cover, and the sport-mode automatic transmission. All models received an enhanced security system.

See also
 Subaru BRAT

References 

Baja
All-wheel-drive vehicles
Cars introduced in 2002
Motor vehicles manufactured in the United States
Sport utility trucks